Un posto al sole (English: A Place in the Sun) is an Italian soap opera transmitted by Rai 3 since 1996. It is set in a fictional apartment building called Palazzo Palladini, located in front of the sea in the Naples neighborhood of Posillipo.

It is an original series created by Wayne Doyle, Adam Bowen and Gino Ventriglia with the collaboration of Michele Zatta and it employs similar production methods to the Australian soap opera Neighbours from the same original producers Reg Grundy Organisation/Fremantle. American comedian Conan O'Brien appeared in a cameo on the show in 2018.

Episode 6140 of Un posto al sole aired on February 24, 2023.

References

External links 
 
 

Italian television series
1996 Italian television series debuts
1990s Italian drama television series
2000s Italian drama television series
2010s Italian drama television series
2020s Italian drama television series
Naples in fiction
RAI original programming